Tadeusz Bradecki (2 January 1955 – 24 January 2022) was a Polish actor and stage director. He died on 24 January 2022, at the age of 67.

Partial filmography
Camera Buff (1979)
The Constant Factor (1980)
A Year of the Quiet Sun (1984)
The Master and Margarita (1988)
Schindler's List (1993)
Life as a Fatal Sexually Transmitted Disease (2000)
Karol: A Man Who Became Pope (2005)
Persona Non Grata (2005)

References

1955 births
2022 deaths
People from Zabrze
20th-century Polish male actors
Polish theatre directors
Polish film actors
Polish opera directors
Polish male stage actors
Recipients of the Silver Medal for Merit to Culture – Gloria Artis